North Dakota's 2nd congressional district is an obsolete congressional district in the state of North Dakota that was created by reapportionments in 1913, and eliminated by the reapportionments in 1933. North Dakota elected its two Representatives in a two-member at large district from 1932 to 1960, but then resurrected single-member districts in 1962. The district was eliminated by the reapportionment as a result of the 1970 redistricting cycle after the 1970 United States census. The seat was last filled from 1971 to 1973 by Arthur A. Link, who sought the office of Governor of North Dakota after not being able to run again for the defunct seat.

Boundaries

When existing between 1913 and 1933, the district included the capital Bismarck and consisted of the following counties of central North Dakota: Bottineau, Rolette, McHenry, Pierce, Benson, Sheridan, Wells, Eddy, Foster, Griggs, Stutsman, Barnes, Kidder, Burleigh, Emmons, Logan, McIntosh, LaMoure, and Dickey.

The 1963 recreation was different, consisting of the western half of the state, again including Bismarck. It contained the following counties: Bottineau, McHenry, Sheridan, Wells, Kidder, Burleigh, Emmons, Logan, McIntosh, Divide, Burke, Renville, Ward, Mountrail, Williams, McKenzie, McLean, Dunn, Mercer, Oliver, Billings, Stark, Morton, Hettinger, Bowman, Adams, Golden Valley, Grant, Slope and Sioux.

List of members representing the district

Election results

Recreated in 1962

References

 Congressional Biographical Directory of the United States 1774–present

02
Former congressional districts of the United States
1913 establishments in North Dakota
1973 disestablishments in North Dakota
Constituencies established in 1913
Constituencies disestablished in 1973